David Nicholas Yeandle (born 27 February 1955 in Cambridge) is a British Germanist and author. He is Emeritus Professor and Senior Research Fellow at King's College London and an Affiliated Lecturer in German at the University of Cambridge. He has published widely on German language and literature, including Old High German, Middle High German, and the modern German language.  Since taking early retirement in 2010, he has further developed a research interest in ecclesiastical history, particularly of the Anglican Church.

Selected publications
 Commentary on the Soltane and Jeschute Episodes in Book III of Wolfram von Eschenbach’s Parzival (116,5–138,8) (Heidelberg: Winter, 1984) [also: David Nicholas Yeandle, "A Detailed, Critical Commentary on the Soltane and Jeschute Episodes in Book III of Wolfram von Eschenbach’s Parzival". (University of Cambridge: PhD Dissertation, 1982)] 

 "The Ludwigslied: King, Church, and Context’", in: "mit regulu bithuungan": neue Arbeiten zur althochdeutschen Poesie und Sprache, edited by J.L. Flood and D.N. Yeandle (Göppingen: Kümmerle, 1989) 

 Frieden im "Neuen Deutschland". Das Vokabular des "Friedenskampfes": Eine linguistische Analyse und Dokumentation des Friedensvokabulars in der offiziellen Sprache der DDR vornehmlich der ausgehenden 80er Jahre (Heidelberg: Winter, 1991) 

 A Victorian Curate: A Study of the Life and Career of the Rev. Dr John Hunt (Cambridge: Open Book Publishers, 2021)

Notes

References

 

Living people
1955 births
British medievalists
Germanists
Academics of King's College London
People from Cambridge